Anette Gleichmann, née Skaugen (born 1964) is a Norwegian investor and publisher.

She is a part of a large shipping family, as a daughter of Brynjulf Skaugen, Sr.  She changed her surname after marrying Swede Gabi Gleichmann.

In 2010 she and her husband started the publishing house Agora Publishing to publish translations of world literature hitherto untranslated to Norwegian.

References

1964 births
Living people
Norwegian book publishers (people)
Businesspeople from Oslo
20th-century Norwegian businesswomen
20th-century Norwegian businesspeople
Women book publishers (people)
21st-century Norwegian businesswomen
21st-century Norwegian businesspeople